The elegant forest skink (Sphenomorphus concinnatus)  is a species of skink found in Bougainville.

References

concinnatus
Reptiles described in 1887
Taxa named by George Albert Boulenger
Reptiles of the Solomon Islands